The 1991 British Speedway Championship was the 31st edition of the British Speedway Championship. The Final took place on 19 May at Brandon in Coventry, England. The Championship was won by Gary Havelock, who won a scored a 15-point maximum. Kelvin Tatum finished second, with Chris Louis completing the rostrum in third.

Final 
19 May 1991
 Brandon Stadium, Coventry

{| width=100%
|width=50% valign=top|

See also 
 British Speedway Championship
 1991 Individual Speedway World Championship

References 

British Speedway Championship
Great Britain